Igor Pribac (born 1958) is a Slovenian philosopher and political commentator.

Life
Born in Koper in the Slovenian Littoral, then part of Yugoslavia, where he attended high school. He studied philosophy and sociology at the University of Ljubljana. He obtained a MA with a thesis on Spinoza's criticism of Descartes under the supervision of the philosopher Božidar Debenjak. In 1998, he obtained a PhD with a thesis on natural law in Hobbes and Spinoza. From 1985 to 2021, he was a professor at the Faculty of Arts of the University of Ljubljana.

Work
He has translated several philosophical texts from English and Italian, including Will Kymlicka, Paolo Virno, Cesare Beccaria, and Thomas Hobbes.

He has also written on a variety of subjects, including psychology and psychoanalysis, natural law, early modern political theory, and the notion of post-modernism. He has published several reflections on contemporary issues, including on animal rights, television, and the changing role of marriage in post-modern societies, from a philosophical perspective. He has been a supporter of euthanasia and of the basic income.

Major works 
Gledanje televizije ('Watching Television', Ljubljana: ŠOU, 1993)
Očetov delež ('The Share of the Father', Ljubljana: ČKZ, 1993)
Prava poroka? : 12 razmišljanj o zakonski zvezi, with Zdravko Kobe ('True Marriage: 12 Reflections on Matrimony', Ljubljana: Krtina, 2006)

References 

Short bibliography with photo

External links 
Interview with the daily newspaper Dnevnik 

1958 births
Living people
Writers from Koper
Slovenian translators
Italian–Slovene translators
English–Slovene translators
University of Ljubljana alumni
Academic staff of the University of Ljubljana
20th-century Slovenian philosophers
20th-century translators